Eric Hornby (31 March 1923 – 29 January 2018) was an English footballer, who played as a full back in the Football League for Tranmere Rovers and Crewe Alexandra.

References

External links

Tranmere Rovers F.C. players
Crewe Alexandra F.C. players
Association football fullbacks
English Football League players
New Brighton A.F.C. players
1923 births
2018 deaths
English footballers